Jomi District is a district in Khatlon Region of Tajikistan, located north of the regional capital Bokhtar. The population of the district is 175,800 (January 2020 estimate). Called Kuybyshevskiy District in Soviet times, then Hojamaston District until 2004, and finally renamed Jomi District in honor of the 15th century Persian Poet Abdurahman Jami (transliterated as Jomi in Tajiki). The district capital is the town Abdurahmoni Jomi (former name: Kuybyshevsk).

Administrative divisions
They are as follows:

References

Districts of Khatlon Region
Districts of Tajikistan